Chaldoran-e Jonubi Rural District is in the Central District of Chaldoran County, West Azerbaijan province, Iran. At the National Census of 2006, its population was 9,735 in 1,756 households. There were 10,663 inhabitants in 2,368 households at the following census of 2011. At the most recent census of 2016, the population of the rural district was 9,661 in 2,320 households. The largest of its 65 villages was Mokhor, with 1,225 people.

References 

Chaldoran County

Rural Districts of West Azerbaijan Province

Populated places in West Azerbaijan Province

Populated places in Chaldoran County